Tonkin is a hamlet in Rural Municipality of Wallace No. 243, Saskatchewan, Canada.

See also
 List of communities in Saskatchewan

References

Wallace No. 243, Saskatchewan
Unincorporated communities in Saskatchewan
Division No. 9, Saskatchewan